Bellevue Education is an international private schools group founded in 2003 and based in London, UK. By 2019 it has grown to consist of 19 schools in the UK and 1 each in France and Switzerland. The Group also provides educational support to Bellevue Place Group, a group of Free Schools to which Bellevue's CEO, Mark Malley, and its Group Schools Director, Steve Wade, are Trustees. The group's early growth was driven by funding derived largely from Tarek Obaid, the founder of the oil company PetroSaudi, which has been implicated in the 1MDB scandal. Bellevue Education was acquired by GEMS Education in 2018, and is a UK and European subsidiary of the Group. In 2019, CVC acquired a 30% stake in GEMS Education, which also includes its stake in Bellevue Education.

History 
Bellevue Education was founded under the name House Education by Mark Malley in 2003, when he bought Norfolk House preparatory school in London. He also became the headteacher, and when the school was inspected in 2007 it was reported to be significantly improved from its previous inspection.

In 2008 House Education was renamed The Really Great Education Company Limited (EDCO) and purchased Weston Green School in Surrey. It also purchased Skippers Hill Manor Preparatory School in East Sussex in 2010.

The company adopted the name Bellevue Education Group in 2011, prior to acquiring three more independent schools: Edenhurst Preparatory School in Staffordshire, Brabyns Preparatory School in Cheshire, and Gateway School in Buckinghamshire.

In 2012, Bellevue Education Group was reported to be jointly owned by Mark Malley, with a 35% stake, and its chairman Marwan Naja, owner of Plato One Ltd and Plato Two Ltd. Further investment in that year by Plato Two Ltd coincided with the establishment of Bellevue Education International Limited, of which Bellevue Education Group became a wholly owned subsidiary. The parent company completed the acquisition of a Swiss boarding school, Surval Mont-Fleuri, subsequently renamed as Surval Montreux. The group's early growth was driven by funding derived largely from Tarek Obaid, the founder of the oil company PetroSaudi, which has been implicated in the 1MDB scandal.

Bellevue Education formed a joint venture with Place Group, the Bellevue Place Education Trust (BPET), which operates seven, state funded, primary "Free Schools" across London and the South-East. The Group's CEO, Mark Malley, and School Director, Steve Wade, form part of the Trustees of Bellevue Place.

Bellevue Education was acquired by GEMS Education in 2018, and is a UK and European subsidiary of the Group. In 2019, the private equity group CVC Capital Partners acquired a 30% stake in GEMS Education, which also includes its stake in Bellevue Education. Khazanah Nasional, Malaysia's sovereign fund, owns a 3% stake.

The Group has continued its growth with its new shareholders, and recently acquired Farlington School in September 2019.

References 

Education companies of the United Kingdom
Founders of English schools and colleges